Patrick Henry "Red" Shea (November 29, 1898 – November 17, 1981) was a Major League Baseball pitcher who played in  with the Philadelphia Athletics, and  and  with the New York Giants.

External links

1898 births
1981 deaths
Major League Baseball pitchers
Baseball players from Massachusetts
New York Giants (NL) players
Philadelphia Athletics players
People from Ware, Massachusetts
People from Stafford, Connecticut